Microsoft Fingerprint Reader was a device sold by Microsoft, primarily for homes and small businesses.  The underlying software providing the biometrics was developed by Digital Persona.  

Fingerprint readers are more secure, reliable and convenient than a normal traditional password, although they have been subject to spoofing. A fingerprint recognition system is more tightly linked to a specific user than, e.g., an access card, which can be stolen.

History 
First released on September 4 2004, this device was supported by Windows XP and Windows Vista x86 operating systems. It was discontinued shortly after Windows Vista was released.

Functionality
The Fingerprint Reader's software allows the registration of up to ten fingerprints per device. Login names and passwords associated with the registered fingerprints were stored in a database on the user's computer.

On presentation of an authorized fingerprint, the software passes the associated login names and passwords to compatible applications and websites, allowing login without a keyboard. If the software finds that the particular fingerprint does not match one it its database, it declines the access.

Application

64-bit Windows
The Microsoft Fingerprint Reader may be modified to work with 64-bit Windows.

Firefox browser 
The reader works with Firefox using the FingerFox Add-on.

See also
Fingerprint
Fingerprint Verification Competition

References

External links
WebArchive of MS Fingerprint home page

FingerprintReader
Biometrics
Computer access control